Universitet, named after the nearby Moscow State University, is a station on the Moscow Metro's Sokolnicheskaya Line. It opened in 1959 and has rectangular white marble pylons and tiled walls. The architects were V. Litvinov, M. Markovsky, L. Lile and V. Dobrakovsky. The station's two round entrance vestibules (architect Ivan Taranov) are located on either side of Prospekt Vernadskogo at Lomonosovsky Prospekt.

Moscow Metro stations
Railway stations in Russia opened in 1959
Sokolnicheskaya Line
Railway stations located underground in Russia
Railway stations at university and college campuses
Cultural heritage monuments of regional significance in Moscow